The 2019 BWF World Senior Championships, officially YONEX BWF World Senior Badminton Championships Katowice 2019, was a badminton tournament which was held from 4 to 11 August 2019 at Spodek in Katowice, Poland.

Participants

Medal summary

Medal table

Medalists

References

External links
Tournament link

 
BWF World Senior Championships
2019 in badminton
2019 in Polish sport
International sports competitions hosted by Poland
Badminton tournaments in Poland
Sports competitions in Katowice
BWD World Senior Championships